Theódóra Mathiesen (born 5 April 1975) is an Icelandic alpine skier. She competed in two events at the 1998 Winter Olympics.

References

1975 births
Living people
Icelandic female alpine skiers
Olympic alpine skiers of Iceland
Alpine skiers at the 1998 Winter Olympics
Place of birth missing (living people)
20th-century Icelandic women